Monkey on a Chain Gang is the first album by the rock band House of Freaks. It was released in 1987 by  Rhino Records on 12" vinyl (R1 70838) and a short time later on CD (R2 70838). The album was remastered and reissued by Rhino Handmade in 2004 (RHM2 7857), with thirteen additional tracks, five of which were previously unreleased.

Track listing
Original Album
1 "Crack in the Sidewalk"
2 "40 Years"
3 "Cactusland"
4 Lonesome Graveyard"
5"Black Cat Bone"
6 "Bottom of the Ocean"
7 "Monkey's Paw"
8 "Yellow Dog"
9 "Long Black Train"
10 "My Backyard"
11 "Give Me a Sign"
12 "Dark and Light in New Mexico"
13 "You Can Never Go Home"

Bonus Tracks (2004 Reissue)
14 "I'll Treat You Right Someday"
15 "Corinna, Corinna"

16 "Monkey's Paw (Live)"
17 "Yellow Dog (Live)"
18 "Pass Me the Gun (Live)"
19 "Can't Change the World Anymore (Live)"
20 "Ten More Minutes to Live (Live)"
21 "Parchment Farm Blues (Live)"

22 "Bottom of the Ocean (Early Version)"
23 "Crack in the Sidewalk (Early Version)"
24 "Give Me a Sign (Early Version)"
25 "While You Sleep
26 "Barn Burning"

Tracks 14-15 from the 12" Single Bottom Of The Ocean, Rhino #70408 (1987)
Tracks 17, 21 from the 12" Promotional Single Live At Raji's, Rhino #RN RP3 (1987).
Tracks 16, 18-20, 22-26 previously unreleased.

References

External links
Rhino Handmade: Monkey On A Chain Gang by the House of Freaks

1987 albums
Rhino Entertainment albums